Headland Municipal Airport  is a city-owned, public-use airport located two nautical miles (4 km) northeast of the central business district of Headland, a city in Henry County, Alabama, United States.

This airport is included in the FAA's National Plan of Integrated Airport Systems for 2011–2015 and 2009–2013, both of which categorized it as a general aviation facility.

Facilities and aircraft 
Headland Municipal Airport covers an area of 328 acres (133 ha) at an elevation of 359 feet (109 m) above mean sea level. It has two runways: 9/27 is 5,002 by 80 feet (1,525 x 24 m) with an asphalt pavement and 17/35 is 2,865 by 162 feet (873 x 49 m) with a turf surface.

For the 12-month period ending November 5, 2010, the airport had 41,203 aircraft operations, an average of 112 per day: 90% general aviation and 10% military. At that time there were 30 aircraft based at this airport: 93% single-engine and 7% multi-engine.

See also 
 List of airports in Alabama

References

External links 
 Headland Municipal Airport
 Aerial image as of February 1997 from USGS The National Map
 

Airports in Alabama
Transportation buildings and structures in Henry County, Alabama